Portland City Hall is the center of city government in Portland, Maine. It is located at 389 Congress Street, and is set in a prominent rise, anchoring a cluster of civic buildings at the eastern end of Portland's downtown. The structure was built in 1909-12 and was listed on the National Register of Historic Places in 1973.

Architecture
Portland City Hall occupies much of an entire city block, bounded by Congress, Myrtle, and Chestnut Streets, and Cumberland Avenue. Its original main portion is a U-shaped granite structure, the U open to Congress Street. A modern ell extends along Myrtle Street, behind the right leg of the U. The central portion is three stories in height, with roof dormers fronted by a low balustrade. A tower,  in height rises from the center of this section. Ground floor windows are set in rounded openings, a feature continued around the wings. There are three entrances, accessed via a broad set of stairs; the central one is topped by the city seal. The wings are two stories in height, with projecting colonnades of Tuscan columns facing the inside of the U. The wings are covered by hip roofs, with a bracketed cornice extending around.

The interior of the building houses the city's offices. The addition on Myrtle Street also includes Merrill Auditorium, a 1,908 seat performance venue. The organ it houses, the Kotzschmar Memorial Organ, was the second largest in the world at the time of its construction in 1912.

The first city hall was first built on this site in 1862 to replace the 1825 city hall in Market Square. It was destroyed in the city's Great Fire of 1866. Rebuilt to a design by Francis H. Fassett, its replacement burned in 1908. This city hall was designed by New York City firm Carrere & Hastings, with local assistance provided by John Calvin Stevens and John Howard Stevens. It was inspired by New York City Hall, and was considered by John M. Carrere to be one of his finest works.

See also

National Register of Historic Places listings in Portland, Maine

References

External links 
 

City halls in Maine
Buildings and structures in Portland, Maine
Government buildings completed in 1909
City and town halls on the National Register of Historic Places in Maine
Clock towers in Maine
Government of Portland, Maine
Carrère and Hastings buildings
Beaux-Arts architecture in Maine
National Register of Historic Places in Portland, Maine